The 2009 Baseball World Cup (BWC) was the 38th international men's amateur baseball tournament. The tournament was sanctioned by the International Baseball Federation, which titled it the Amateur World Series from the 1938 tournament through the 1986 AWS. The 2009 tournament was held, for the first time, across a continent — with games played in 27 cities across eight European countries, from September 9 to 27. The final was a repeat of the previous BWC final, with the United States again defeating Cuba, winning its fourth title.

There were 22 participating countries (which stands as the most ever in tournament history), with 20 teams split into five groups for the first round, after which "official" host Italy and 2007 European Champion Netherlands joined the advancing 14 teams in the second round.

The next competition would be the last amateur championship held as the BWC tournament, which was replaced in 2015 by the quadrennial WBSC Premier12.

Format

Previous editions of the World Cup were held with no more than 18 teams. These teams were initially broken up into two pools, with the top teams from each pool qualifying for the final knockout stage. With 22 teams competing in the 2009 tournament, the format has been expanded into three phases. Teams that play from the first round and finish among the top eight teams of the tournament will now have played as many as 15 games, making it one of the longest campaigns for any international baseball tournament.

All of the teams, with the exception of Italy and Netherlands, will compete in the first round (as hosts for the second-round games, Italy and Netherlands receive a bye through the first round). The teams will be broken into five pools of four teams each. Each pool will be held in a different country, with the hosts Czech Republic, Spain, Sweden, Croatia and Germany assigned to the corresponding pools. (Previously, Russia had been set as the host nation for Pool D, however they were replaced by Croatia in an announcement from the IBAF.) Unlike the 2009 World Baseball Classic, the pools will be conducted in single round-robin format. The top two teams from each pool will automatically qualify for the second round, while four of the five third-place finishers will also qualify as wild cards. In some respects, the first round is like a final qualifying tournament, similar to the format used for the 2008 Beijing Olympics.

The second round operates similarly to the first, but on an expanded scale. The field of teams is split into two pools, one hosted in Italy, the other in the Netherlands. The fourteen qualifiers from the first round are assigned to the pools, and commence a single round-robin competition. The top four teams from each pool then qualify for the third and final round.

The third round is broken into two parts: a partial round-robin and then four classification games, including the final. Each team will play four games during the round-robin phase, against the teams they have not yet faced (in Round 2) who also qualified – i.e. the teams from the Italian pool will face the teams from the Netherlands pool, but not each other. The teams are then ranked on their results in this phase and in games of the 2nd round between qualified teams, but in two groups based on the pool they qualified from. Each team then plays a classification game against their counterpart from the opposite group to determine their final placings in the tournament – i.e. the fourth place Italian qualifier faces the fourth place Netherlands qualifier to determine seventh and eighth positions, the third place qualifiers compete for fifth and sixth positions, and so on. The winner of the final classification game will be declared the winner of the World Cup for 2009.

Tiebreaking procedures
The IBAF employs a standard tiebreaking system across all tournaments it sanctions, though it will use a modified version for this World Cup. Ordinarily there are five criteria available to be used when two or more teams finish the tournament (or a section thereof) with the same winning percentage; if the first method does not split the teams involved, the next one is used, continuing down the list of methods until a distinction is achieved. The criteria used to determine the higher placed finishing team, in order, are:
 the team with the better head-to-head record for the teams involved
 the team with the better ratio of runs allowed per fielding inning subtracted from the ratio of runs scored per batting inning, referred to as the "Team Quality Balance", from the games involving the tied teams
 the team with the better "Earned Run Team Quality Balance" – the same as No. 2 but using only earned runs as opposed to all runs
 the team with the highest batting average from the head-to-head games
 a coin flip.
For this World Cup though, a simplified method of tiebreaking will be used:
 the team with the better head-to-head record for the teams involved
 the team with the fewest  runs allowed
 the team with the lowest earned run average
 the team with the highest batting average.
In the case of determining the four wild card teams that will progress from the first to the second round, the first measure will automatically be skipped, as it will be impossible for the teams to have played against each other.

Teams

Twenty-two teams qualified for the tournament, either through finishing high enough in the 2007 World Cup, placing high enough in regional tournaments that doubled as qualifying tournaments for the event, or by automatic qualification by hosting some part of the tournament.

Round 1

Group A

Group B

Group C

Group D

Group E

Wild cards

Round 2

Group F

Group G

Round 3

Semi finals
Group 1

Group 2

Final round

7th place game

5th place game

Bronze medal game

Final

Final standings

Awards
The IBAF announced the following awards at the completion of the tournament.

References

External links

Official website
Host website
CEB World Cup Slideshow

World Cup
International baseball competitions in Europe
Baseball World Cup
International baseball competitions hosted by the Czech Republic
International baseball competitions hosted by Germany
International baseball competitions hosted by Spain
International baseball competitions hosted by Italy
International baseball competitions hosted by Sweden
International baseball competitions hosted by the Netherlands
International sports competitions hosted by San Marino
International sports competitions hosted by Croatia
2009 in German sport
2009 in Dutch sport
2009 in Spanish sport
2009 in Swedish sport
2009 in Czech sport
2009 in Italian sport
2009 in Croatian sport
2009 in San Marino
September 2009 sports events in Europe
Sports competitions in Messina